{{DISPLAYTITLE:Nu2 Canis Majoris}}

Nu2 Canis Majoris (ν2 Canis Majoris) is a single star in the southern constellation of Canis Major.

Characteristics
With an apparent visual magnitude of 3.96, it is bright enough to be seen with the naked eye to the southwest of Sirius. It has an annual parallax shift of around 50.63 mas as seen from Earth, thus this system is about 64.4 light years from the Sun, a parallax well within the error margins of the figure later given by the Gaia space observatory data release 2, namely 50.471 ± 0.4168.

It is an evolved K-type giant around 4.6 billion years old. Around 1.3 times as massive as the Sun, it has expanded to around 4.9 times the Sun's diameter and 11 times its luminosity. In 2011, it was found to have a planet.

Chinese name

In Chinese astronomy, ν2 Canis Majoris is called 野雞, Pinyin: Yějī, meaning Wild Cockerel, because this star is marking itself and stand alone in Wild Cockerel asterism, Well mansion (see : Chinese constellation). 野雞 (Yějī), westernized into Ya Ke. According to R.H. Allen opinion, the name Ya Ke is asterism consisting ο1 Canis Majoris and π Canis Majoris, with other small stars in the body of the Dog

Planetary system
By measuring periodic variations in the radial velocity of the host star between 2009 and 2010, the Pan-Pacific Planet Search program was able to identify a planet orbiting Nu2 Canis Majoris. An orbital fit produced a minimum mass estimate of with an orbital period of 2.1 years and an eccentricity of 0.23. Star spots were ruled out as a source for the signal with a false-alarm probability of 98.7%. Further observations through 2019 detected the planet, as well as a secondary planet c in a 4:3 orbital resonance with planet b.

References

External links
 Spectrophotometric data for the star

Canis Major
Canis Majoris, Nu2
K-type giants
Planetary systems with two confirmed planets
Canis Majoris, 07
031592
2429
047205
Durchmusterung objects
0239.1